William Stuart Lancaster, known as Stuart Lancaster (born 9 October 1969) is a rugby union coach. He was the head coach of the English national rugby union team from 2011 until he stepped down on 11 November 2015, following the failure to qualify for the Quarter Finals of the Rugby World Cup. On 5 September 2016 it was announced that Lancaster would join the backroom team of Irish provincial side, Leinster Rugby. After a highly successful spell with Leinster, the club announced on 26 September 2022 that he would be leaving to join French Top14 side Racing 92 for the following season.

Early life and education

Lancaster was born in Penrith, Cumberland. He grew up in the village of Culgaith, where he was sent to St. Bees School. He started his rugby playing career at the school playing for the 1st XV. He started in the front row as a hooker, although at the age of 15, he moved to flanker where he played his best rugby. After leaving school in 1988, Lancaster headed to Carnegie College in Leeds to train as a PE Teacher, while continuing his rugby career playing for Wakefield RFC. After qualifying in 1991, he began teaching at Kettlethorpe High School.

Playing career
In 1991 Lancaster started playing for Headingley RFC. When Headingley merged with Roundhay RUFC, Lancaster joined the newly formed team Leeds RFU, where he would play the remainder of career. In 1998, he took a substantial leave from teaching to become a full-time professional rugby player with Leeds Tykes, of which he became the first Leeds player to play a century of games since the amalgamation of Headingley and Roundhay, and was named captain of newly branded team.

Through his Scottish mother he played for Scotland Students, Scotland U19 and Scotland U21. Lancaster was forced to retire from playing rugby aged 30. A teenage Tom Palmer, who would later play under Lancaster, hit a tackle bag that Stuart was holding, tearing his hamstring off the bone completely.

Honours
Wakefield RFC
Yorkshire County Cup
Winners: 1990 (Wakefield RFC), 1998 (Leeds Tykes)

Coaching career
After retiring in 2000, Lancaster ran the Leeds RFU Academy for five years from 2001. However, in 2006 after Leeds Tykes were relegated after the 2005–06 Guinness Premiership season, Lancaster replaced Phil Davies as head coach before the 2006–07 National Division One. In Lancaster's debut season, he led Leeds to promotion with 122 points. The victory was without high-profile players like Justin Marshall and Iain Balshaw. Now back in the top flight English rugby competition, Leeds Carnegie – the renamed title of the club – remained bottom of the table for the whole season, only getting 2 victories from 22, and were relegated at the end of the 2007–08 Guinness Premiership season. Lancaster later departed the club after being appointed RFU's Elite Rugby Director.

Appointment to the England RFU
Rob Andrew, the RFU's Elite Rugby Director announced Lancaster's appointment on 6 May 2008 stating "This is a very important appointment for the department. Stuart brings Guinness Premiership coaching experience and is also one of the coaches who has achieved the Elite Coaching Level 5 qualification." The move was taken poorly by the owners of Leeds Carnegie the club where he was Director of Rugby before joining the RFU, who felt they should have been contacted regarding the appointment.

Part of Lancaster's role was to develop younger players, which saw Lancaster coach the England Saxons during the 2008 Churchill Cup winning campaign. This included a 62–10 win over the United States and a 34–12 win over the Ireland Wolfhounds, to set up a Cup Final against Scotland A, of which England Saxons won 36–19. Lancaster returned to role for the 2010 Churchill Cup, which saw the Saxons win all three of their matches including the cup final against Canada, winning 38–18. He oversaw the Saxons sixth winning campaign during the 2011 Churchill Cup, which for the first time England hosted. The winning campaign included a record 87–8 victory over the United States and a 41–14 win over Tonga. They beat Canada for a second consecutive year, winning 37–6 at the Sixways Stadium in Worcester. In addition to the England Saxons, Lancaster also oversaw an impressive period for the England U20's team, which included a grand slam victory during the 2011 Six Nations Under 20s Championship and three finals berths in the IRB Junior World Championship between 2008 and 2011.

England head coach
Lancaster's tenure as head coach has been praised for the overhaul and reformation of England's squad culture, which had resulted in much media attention to the team's off-field antics during the 2011 Rugby World Cup, which immediately preceded Lancaster's reign. Lancaster has demanded that England's players be good role models, and as such has excluded players from various squads. Examples of this policy include Danny Care's exclusion from the 2012 Six Nations Championship, and Manu Tuilagi's omission from England's 2015 Rugby World Cup preparations. However, Lancaster's team selections, particularly at centre, and his failure to select or develop a specialist openside flanker for England have been criticised.

Following the 2011 Rugby World Cup, England head coach Martin Johnson resigned from his post, with the RFU appointing Lancaster as interim head coach for the 2012 Six Nations Championship, while the RFU continued to search for a full-time coach, with the likes of South African Nick Mallett and New Zealander Wayne Smith reportedly expressing interest in the vacant job. On 29 March 2012, following a second-place finish in the Six Nations campaign, Lancaster was appointed as the English head coach, keeping his assistants Graham Rowntree and Andy Farrell.

Lancaster's first match in charge as the official head coach came on 27 May 2012 against the Barbarians, which England won 57–26, though this was not a full test match. this was followed by a three test tour of South Africa. The 9 June clash with South Africa was Lancaster's first test match in charge, and England lost to the Springboks 22–17. A week later England were defeated again 36–27. However, in the final test on 23 June 2015, England secured a 14–14 draw, their first draw since 8 December 1906.

During the 2012 end-of-year rugby union internationals, Lancaster led the English to narrow defeats to Australia 20–14 and South Africa 15–16, before leading England to a 38–21 victory over World Cup Champions New Zealand. Despite beating the No. 1 ranked team in the world, England's earlier losses proved costly, as they lowered England's seeding for the 2015 Rugby World Cup draw, held three years in advance. On 1 December 2012, England were drawn in Pool A for the World Cup, alongside Australia and Wales.

During 2013, Lancaster led England to second in the Six Nations for a second consecutive year. Lancaster led the team to a 12–6 victory over Ireland in Ireland, England's first victory in Ireland since their 2003 Grand Slam triumph. England could have claimed their first grand slam since 2003, however a record 30–3 loss to Wales in the final week at the Millennium Stadium, saw Wales claim the Six Nations title. The scale of the defeat saw Lancaster criticised for his selection of inside centre, and the balance of England's back row, which lacked a breakdown specialist to compete with Wales' Sam Warburton and Justin Tipuric.

In the summer of 2013, Lancaster led England to a 2–0 test series victory over Argentina, with England winning their matches by 32–3 and 51–26 on Argentine soil. On 2 November 2013, Lancaster reclaimed the Cook Cup after leading England to a 20–13 victory over Australia, before beating Argentina for a third consecutive time 31–12. England's 2013 Autumn campaign ended with a 22–30 loss to the All Blacks, who retained the Hillary Shield after losing it in 2012.

In 2014, England finished second in the Six Nations for a third time under Lancaster, with a loss against France, 26–24 in Paris, coming in the opening week of the tournament. England did however record a 20–0 victory over Scotland in Edinburgh, which was the first time Scotland had failed to score any points against England since 1978, and defeated Wales, Ireland, and Italy.

During England's 2014 tour to New Zealand, Lancaster narrowly lost to the All Blacks 20–15 at Eden Park. In this first test, the English team did not feature any Saracens or Northampton Saints players due to a scheduling clash with the 2013–14 Aviva Premiership final a week before the opening test, when Lancaster needed his squad to attend England's training camp. The second test, where Saracens and Saints players returned to the starting XV, saw England lose by a single point, losing 28–27 in Dunedin. New Zealand won the final test 36–13 to claim a 3–0 series victory over England. England started their 2014 Autumn campaign with a fourth consecutive match against the World Champions, which saw New Zealand win 24–21. In the following week, England lost their fifth consecutive match, their worst run of defeats since their 7 consecutive losses in 2006, losing 31–28 to South Africa. The losing streak ended on 22 November, when England beat Samoa 28–9, while on 29 November, Lancaster led England against Australia to win 26–17.

During the 2015 Six Nations Championship, Lancaster led England to a fourth consecutive second position in the Six Nations. Lancaster was applauded for his coaching during the opening match against Wales, which saw an England side depleted due to injury beat a first choice Welsh side 21–16 in Cardiff. England lost one match, to eventual champions Ireland, 19–9 in Dublin.

During England's preparations for the 2015 World Cup, Lancaster took the squad to Colorado for a 2-week training programme, followed by tests against France and Ireland. England beat France at Twickenham 19–14, but lost the return fixture 25–20. Their final warm-up match saw England beat Ireland 21–13.

During the 2015 Rugby World Cup, Lancaster led England to their worst ever performance at a World Cup. England became the first English team, and the first former World Champions to be knocked out in the group stages of the tournament. Having beaten Fiji in the opening match 35–11, England went on to lose to both Wales, 28–25, and Australia 33–13. Not only did this mean England were eliminated from the tournament after only three weeks of matches, but until the final week there was a risk that England may not finish third to automatically qualify for the 2019 Rugby World Cup. After Uruguay's loss to Fiji on 6 October and England's third-place finish, qualification for 2019 was confirmed. The 33–13 loss against Australia was England's largest ever defeat to Australia at Twickenham. A week after being knocked out of their own World Cup, England played their first home match away from Twickenham in over a decade. They faced Uruguay at the City of Manchester Stadium, winning 60–3. The match saw Lancaster select his 20th mid-field (fly-half and centre combination) in his 4 years in charge. Inconsistent mid-field selection was one of the main issues on which England's early departure from the World Cup was blamed.	

Following the conclusion of the 2015 Rugby World Cup, Lancaster, along with his assistant coaches and the RFU, were particularly severely criticised for their handling of Rugby League convert, Sam Burgess. Lancaster had selected Burgess to play for England as a centre, despite Burgess being developed as a flanker by his club Bath, and despite Burgess's relative inexperience, having only played 17 games for his club. Lancaster's selection appeared to be inconsistent with some of his previously stated principles, that he would select players based on form, and that he would not select outsiders, such as English players based in the Top 14, in part because it might unsettle players who had been in the England squad for a number of seasons. Burgess left Rugby Union to return to Rugby League shortly after the conclusion of the Rugby World Cup. Mike Ford, Burgess's coach at Bath, later stated that he felt Burgess would have stayed in Rugby Union had he not been picked in England's World Cup squad.

On 11 November 2015, Lancaster announced his resignation as England Head Coach, taking full "responsibility for the team's performance during the tournament".

Leinster Rugby

On 5 September 2016, Leinster Rugby announced that Lancaster would join their backroom team with immediate effect as a senior coach. It had been thought that the coaching staff for Leinster was complete, however the sudden departure of Kurt McQuilkin, due to family reasons, meant there was a position available. He was hailed as an inspirational coach by the Leinster players following the sides victory over Racing 92 in the 2018 Champions Cup final. During his time at the club and as part of the senior coaching team, Leinster also won four Guinness PRO12/14 titles.  On 26 September 2022, Leinster Rugby announced that Lancaster would be leaving to join French Top14 side Racing 92 for the following season.

International matches as head coach

Record by country

All matches
Note: World Rankings Column shows the World Ranking England was placed at on the following Monday after each of their matches

Honours
Six Nations Championship
Runners-up: 2012, 2013, 2014, 2015
Triple Crown
Winners: 2014
Calcutta Cup
Winners: 2012, 2013, 2014, 2015
Cook Cup
Winners: 2013, 2014
Hillary Shield
Winners: 2012
Millennium Trophy
Winners: 2012, 2013, 2014
Killik Cup
Winners: 2012, 2013

Other honours
Leeds Carnegie
National Division One
Winners: 2007

England Saxons
Churchill Cup
Winners: 2008, 2010, 2011

Leinster
Champions Cup
Winners: 2018
Pro14
Winners: (4) 2017-18, 2018-19, 2019-20, 2020-21

References

External links
Guardian Profile
RFU Profile
Lassen Profile
Stuart Lancaster: Factfile
ESPN Scrum

1969 births
Living people
Alumni of Leeds Beckett University
England national rugby union team coaches
English expatriates in Ireland
English people of Scottish descent
English rugby union coaches
English rugby union players
Leeds Tykes coaches
Leeds Tykes players
Leinster Rugby non-playing staff
People educated at St Bees School
Rugby union players from Penrith, Cumbria
Wakefield RFC players